Raymond Barry Jenks (1937–2018) was an Anglican bishop who served as the eleventh Bishop of British Columbia from 1992 to 2002.

Jenks was educated at the Anglican Theological College British Columbia and ordained in 1965. Following a curacy at St John the Evangelist, North Vancouver he held incumbencies in Sechelt, Departure Bay, Lantzville and Victoria before his appointment to the episcopate.

References

1937 births
Living people
Anglican bishops of British Columbia
20th-century Anglican Church of Canada bishops
21st-century Anglican Church of Canada bishops